Dilesi railway station is a railway station outside the town of Dilesi, in Boeotia, Greece. It is owned by OSE, but service are provided by Hellenic Train, through the Athens Suburban Railway from Athens to Chalcis.

History
The station opened on 6 April 2005. That same year TrainOSE was created as a brand within OSE to concentrate on rail services and passenger interface. In 2008, all Athens Suburban Railway services were transferred from OSE to TrainOSE. In 2014 a disabled ramp was installed to improve access to the platforms. In July 2022, the station began being served by Hellenic Train, the rebranded TrainOSE.

Services

Since 15 May 2022, the following weekday services call at this station:

Station layout

References

Transport in Boeotia
Railway stations in Central Greece
Railway stations opened in 2005